Lady's Secret (April 8, 1982 – March 4, 2003) was an American Eclipse Award winning Thoroughbred racemare that was listed in the Top 100 U.S. Racehorses of the 20th Century. Lady's Secret was bred by Robert H. Spreen at Lucas Farm in Oklahoma. Spreen sold her for $200,000 to Mr. and Mrs. Eugene Klein (former owner of the San Diego Chargers), and she was prepared for racing by Hall of Fame trainer D. Wayne Lukas. She was a small horse, weighing no more than about 900 pounds.

Breeding and background
Lady's Secret was sired by U.S. Triple Crown champion Secretariat and out of Great Lady M., a daughter of Icecapade who was a half brother to Ruffian. Lady's Secret was also closely related to Ruffian on her sire's side since Secretariat and Reviewer (Ruffian's sire) shared a sire in Bold Ruler.

Lady's Secret was bred by Robert H. Spreen at Lucas Farm in Oklahoma. Spreen sold her for $200,000 to Mr. and Mrs. Eugene Klein (former owner of the San Diego Chargers), and she was prepared for racing by Hall of Fame trainer D. Wayne Lukas. She was a small horse, weighing no more than about 900 pounds.

Racing record
Lady's Secret, who was a front runner, won twenty-five of her forty-five races and had nine second-place finishes. The daughter of Secretariat dominated the fillies she raced against and was also competitive against males.

After winning the Moccasin Stakes at age two, Lady's Secret won three important races at age three, including two Grade I events, and ran second to stablemate Life's Magic in the 1985 Breeders' Cup Distaff. In 1986, four-year-old Lady's Secret defeated the nation's best male horses four times, winning ten of her fifteen starts that season, all graded stakes races.  Eight of these stakes wins were Grade 1 events, a single-season Grade 1 winning record only equaled by the champion Cigar during his undefeated 1995 campaign.  Nicknamed "The Iron Lady," Lady's Secret was the first female to win the Whitney Stakes since Gallorette in 1948.  She finished her year by winning the Breeders' Cup Distaff with Pat Day aboard. Her lifetime earnings equaled $3,021,325.

Her performance throughout the 1986 racing season earned her the Eclipse Award for Outstanding Older Female Horse plus the most prestigious honor of all, and a rarity for fillies, the Eclipse Award for Horse of the Year for 1986. Lady's Secret is ranked at number 76 by Blood-Horse magazine in their list of the Top 100 U.S. Thoroughbred champions of the 20th Century.

Stud record
Retired at age five, in 1989 Lady's Secret was sold to Fares Farm in Lexington, Kentucky, as a broodmare.  She and Azeri (horse) are the only two female winners of the Eclipse Award for Horse of the Year to have produced foals by more than one stallion who was also Horse of the Year (Lady's Secret produced foals by Seattle Slew and Skip Away).  Lady's Secret died suddenly on March 4, 2003 at Valley Creek Farm in Valley Center, California, as a result of complications in foaling.  She produced 12 foals, with 10 starters and 5 winners. None of her progeny were of particular note.

In 1992, Lady's Secret was inducted into the National Museum of Racing and Hall of Fame. The Lady's Secret Café at Monmouth Park Racetrack in Oceanport, New Jersey is named in her honor. In 1993, a major race at Santa Anita Park in Arcadia, California, was named in her honor, but from 2012 it was known as the Zenyatta Stakes, after the 2010 American Horse of the Year who won that race in 2008, 2009 and 2010. Lady's Secret Drive in Del Rayo Estates, Rancho Santa Fe, California, where her owner lived, was also named in her memory.  Valley Creek Farm has since been sold.  The new owner is in the process of developing The Lady's Secret Memorial Garden as a tribute to the great race mare.

Pedigree

References

 Women of the Year - Ten Fillies Who Achieved Horse Racing's Highest Honor by the Staff and Correspondents of The Blood-Horse magazine (2004) Eclipse Press

External links

A Swell Dame Wins The Beldame
The Lady's Secret Memorial Garden 

1982 racehorse births
2003 racehorse deaths
Thoroughbred family 22-d
Racehorses trained in the United States
Breeders' Cup Distaff winners
American Thoroughbred Horse of the Year
Racehorses bred in Oklahoma
United States Thoroughbred Racing Hall of Fame inductees
Eclipse Award winners